In Scots and Roman-Dutch laws, a curator bonis is a legal representative appointed by a court to manage the finances, property, or estate of another person unable to do so because of mental or physical incapacity. The corresponding office in common law is that of conservator or guardian of the property.

The Adults with Incapacity (Scotland) Act 2000 provided that it would no longer be competent to appoint a curator bonis to a person who has attained the age of 16, with existing curators becoming guardians under that Act.

See also
Legal guardian
Curator ad litem

References

Scots law legal terminology
South African legal terminology